Mihran Hakobyan (born February 18, 1984) is an Armenian sculptor. He created the 2014 Wikipedia Monument in Słubice, the first one of its type.

Biography 
Mihran Hakobyan was born in Stepanakert. His father, sculptor Armen Hakobyan (1941–1990), died during the First Nagorno-Karabakh War. From 2000 to 2006, he studied sculpting at the Yerevan State Academy of Fine Arts. He thereafter worked in his profession in Armenia and Russia, participated in several exhibitions in Stepanakert and Yerevan.

In 2001, he became a member of the Artists Union of the Nagorno-Karabakh Republic. In 2011, he participated in an international symposium on sculpture in Shusha. Hakobyan mainly creates sculptures of stone, wood or bronze. From 2010 till 2013 he studied Polish Philology at the Collegium Polonicum in Słubice. 2012 Hakobyan received a scholarships of the Polish Kulczyk Foundation.

On behalf of the Director of the Collegium Polonicum, Krzysztof Wojciechowski, Hakobyan created the Wikipedia Monument in Słubice. On 22 October 2014 the monument was unveiled at the Plac Frankurcki (Frankfurt square). The monument was sponsored by the city Słubice with 62,000 zlotys.

Mihran Hakobyan also works with cartoons, especially with plasticine figures. For his cartoon „Зонтик“ (Umbrella) after a story by Leonid Yengibarov he received the audience award at the Short Film Fund in Moscow 2013.

References

External links 

 Website of Mihran Hakobyan
 Works of Mihran Hakobyan Новая Литература
 Pierwszy na świecie pomnik Wikipedii stanął w Słubicach. Gazeta Wyborcza, 23. Oktober 2014 (polish)
The author of Wikipedia first monument

American people of Armenian descent
1984 births
People from Stepanakert
Armenian sculptors
Living people
21st-century sculptors